The 2010 Korea National League Championship was the seventh competition of the Korea National League Championship.

Group stage

Group A

Group B

Group C

Group D

Knockout stage

Bracket

Quarter-finals

Semi-finals

Final

See also
2010 in South Korean football
2010 Korea National League

References

External links
Official website 

Korea National League Championship seasons
K